Charlestown Naval Shipyard Park is an  park in Charlestown's Boston Navy Yard, in the U.S. state of Massachusetts. The Massachusetts Korean War Memorial is installed in the park. The Charlestown Navy Yard Ferry Terminal extends out from the south side of the park.

The Anchor and Navy Yard Commons opened in May 2019.

References

External links
 The Anchor Boston

Charlestown, Boston
Parks in Boston